Mauricio González Sfeir (born 1956) is a petroleum company executive and president of the Bolivian professional football team La Paz F.C. Mr. Gonzalez served as president of YPFB (Yacimientos Petroliferos Fiscales Bolivianos) and Secretary of Energy of Bolivia in the mid-1990s, contributing to the success of the Bolivia-Brazil natural gas pipeline.  He is a co-author of the Baker Institute's "Americas Project."

Mauricio Gonzalez studied economics at DePaul University and Yale University and finance & management at Harvard Business School. Furthermore, he pursued post-graduate studies at Oxford University, while on a Marshall Scholarship. During college, he was a summer intern at the Wall Street investment bank Goldman Sachs.  After completing his university education and prior to returning to Bolivia, Mr. Gonzalez worked as an international management consultant in the London office of The Boston Consulting Group.

Mr. Gonzalez has had a lifelong involvement with sport.  He represented Bolivia in Junior Davis Cup tennis competition at the South American level (once defeating Ricardo Ycaza in doubles), taught tennis at the Welby Van Horn Tennis Camp, and played on the tennis teams of DePaul University (under legendary coach George Lott) and Oxford University. He is a past president of The Strongest football club, a past president of the La Paz Football Association and a past vice-president of the Bolivian Football Federation (Federación Boliviana de Fútbol).

Mr. Gonzalez is a charismatic promoter of Bolivian football (soccer), including junior and women's divisions. He has also been a forceful spokesman and advocate for the proposition that the Bolivia national team and Bolivian club teams should be allowed to play-official international matches—including World Cup qualifying games—in the high altitude cities of La Paz, Oruro, and Potosi.  He is a leading member of an ad hoc committee of prominent Bolivians formed to design a strategy to campaign against the FIFA altitude ban.

Media Coverage

 Numerous articles regarding Mr. Gonzalez's advocacy in defense of Bolivian high-altitude football/soccer

References 

Alumni of the University of Oxford
Boston Consulting Group people
DePaul University alumni
Harvard Business School alumni
Management consultants
Yale University alumni
Living people
1956 births